This list of notable actors from Ireland includes performers in film, television, stage, and radio.

Born in the 17th and 18th centuries
 Spranger Barry (1719–1777)
 Maria Ann Campion (1777–1803)
 Thomas Doggett (1640–1721)
 Anna Marcella Giffard (1707–1777)
 Elizabeth O'Neill (1791–1872)

Born 1800–1849
 Ada Dyas (1843–1908)

Born 1850–1899

Born in the 1900s
 George Brent (1904–1979)
 Harry Brogan (1904–1977)
 Cathleen Delany (1907–1977)
 Hilton Edwards (1903–1982) (born in London)
 Joan Henley (1904–1986)
 Ria Mooney (1903–1973)
 Shelah Richards (1903–1985)
 Eve Watkinson (1909–1999)

Born in the 1910s
 Cyril Cusack (1910–1993) (born in South Africa; Irish-English)
 Eithne Dunne (1919–1988)
 Geraldine Fitzgerald (1913–2005)
 Marie Kean (1918–1993)
 Dan O'Herlihy (1919–2005) (naturalised American citizen)
 Maureen O'Sullivan (1911–1998) (naturalised American citizen)
 Micheline Patton (1912–2001)

Born in the 1920s

Born in the 1930s

Born in the 1940s

Born in the 1950s

Born in the 1960s

Born in the 1970s

Born in the 1980s

Born in the 1990s

Born in the 2000s

Unknown birthdate

See also
 Cinema of Ireland
 Lists of actors
 List of Irish people
 Radio in Ireland
 Television in Ireland
 Theatre of Ireland
 List of Irish Academy Award winners and nominees

References

Irish
Actors